Crataegus macracantha, commonly called large-thorn hawthorn and aubépine á épines longues, is a woody flowering plant native to North America. It is the most widespread North American hawthorn, and highly variable, so it has often been split into other species.

References

macracantha
Plants described in 1838